The DC Superheroes Cafe is a themed restaurant inspired by the wide spectrum of films, TV series, animated movies and comic books of DC Comics. It is operated by Almerak Corp., in partnership with Warner Bros. Consumer Products on behalf of DC Entertainment. It was opened to the public in June 2018. DC Cafe is located at the 4th floor, Mega Fashion Hall, SM Megamall. The cafe is filled with various DC comics, toys and merchandise that are on display and are for sale. Its managing director, Edric Chua, a self-confessed "DC fanboy through and through", brought in Chef Mikel Zaguirre of Locavore and Chef Kalel Demetrio to develop dishes that are inspired by the characters of DC.

References

External links
 

2018 establishments in the Philippines